Mark Naumovich Bernes (– 16 August 1969) was a Soviet actor and singer, who performed some of the most poignant songs to come out of World War II, including "Dark Night" ("Tyomnaya noch"; 1943) and "Cranes" ("Zhuravli"; 1969). His voice had some similarities to Bing Crosby, but his style was closer to French chansonniers such as Yves Montand.

Life and work 
In late 1930s, not long before the war, Mark Bernes starred in two motion pictures: Man With a Rifle and  The Fighter Planes. In both of these films, he performed songs which immediately became famous all over the Soviet Union after each film was released. In the former film, he performed the song "Clouds Rose over the City," which was a romantic song of a simple young Soviet worker. In the later film, he performed a famous patriotic ballad "Beloved Town". This pre-war song was full of hope and optimism, and several years later, encouraged soldiers during the war.

When the war began, Bernes became among the first singers to perform for the Soviet troops. In 1943, he starred in the motion picture Two Fighters. He played a young soldier from Odesa named Arkady Dzubin. In that film, Bernes demonstrated Jewish wit and humor characteristic of Jews from Odessa. In that film, he sang two masterpiece songs: "Dark Is the Night" ("Tyomnaya noch") and "Scows Full of Mullet" ("Shalandy polnye kefali"). The second song is the humorous account of Kostya the sailor from Odessa who ironically spoke to his fiancee Sonya, the fishing girl. The first song, "Dark Is the Night" was a serious ballad about a wife with a baby waiting for a soldier in the midst of a deadly fight. The song was sung by Bernes from the point of view of that soldier, who addressed his wife at home and assured her that he will live through all the deadly battles as long as she waits for him. "Dark Is the Night" is the most recognizable Soviet song from World War II.

Bernes's name had become closely associated with World War II. After the war, he continued to perform songs about the war. His greatest hits of the 1950s were "Muscovites" (also known as "Seryozhka from Malaya Bronnaya Street") and "Enemies Burned the Native Hut Down". Both songs were about hardships suffered by people who lost family members in the war, and expressed extreme melancholy, directly confronting death and grief. The latter song was banned by the government because it was considered purportedly as too pessimistic. In the song, the soldier from front-line dugout bespeaks to his distant wife and his child at the cot, with sad and melancholy, but with hope for future meeting too. 

In the 1950s, Mark Bernes also performed torch songs such as the sentimental ballad I Dreamed of You Three Years, and inspirational optimistic songs such as the march "I Love You, My Life".

In 1969, Mark Bernes was dying from lung cancer. In the summer of 1969, he recorded his last song "Cranes" ("Zhuravli"), which became his swan song. Bernes sang that the soldiers that perished in war turned into cranes, that the cranes are still flying, and, that he will join their ranks. On 16 August, Mark Bernes died. "Cranes" was played at his funeral.

Popular songs
 "Cranes" ("Zhuravli"; 1969)
 "Dark Night" ("Tyomnaya noch"; 1943
 "Scows full of mullet" ("Shalandy polnyie kefali")
 "What does the motherland begin with?" ("S Chego Nachinayetsya Rodina")
 "I love you, Life" ("Ya lyublyu tebya, zhizn")
 "Do the Russians Want War?" ("Khotyat Li Russkie Voyny")
 "Dark mounds are sleeping" ("Spyat Kurgany Tyomnyie")
 "When a distant friend sings" ("Kogda poyot daliokiy drug")
 "Enemies burnt the native hut down" ("Vragi sozhgli rodnuyu khatu")
 "Vast Sky" ("Ogromnoe nebo")

Honors
Bernes received People's Actor of the RSFSR (1965), was awarded the Stalin Prize (1951), Order of the Red Star, Order of the Badge of Honour, Medal "For Valiant Labour in the Great Patriotic War 1941–1945" and few other medals. in 1993, Bernes received a star in his honour on the Star Square in Moscow.

A minor planet 3038 Bernes discovered by Soviet astronomer Nikolai Stepanovich Chernykh in 1978 is named after him.

References

External links 
 

1911 births
1969 deaths
Burials at Novodevichy Cemetery
Communist Party of the Soviet Union members
Deaths from lung cancer in the Soviet Union
Jewish male actors
Jewish singers
People from Nezhinsky Uyezd
People from Nizhyn
People's Artists of the RSFSR
Recipients of the Order of the Red Star
Soviet Jews
Soviet male actors
Soviet male singers
Stalin Prize winners
Ukrainian Jews
Jewish Russian actors